Denis Sergeyevich Sergeev or Denis Sergeyevich Sergeyev (Денис Сергеевич Сергеев; born March 21, 1982 in Vladimir Oblast, Russia) is a Russian amateur boxer who won the silver medal at the 2008 European Amateur Boxing Championships in the super heavyweight division.

Career
Sergeev won a bronze in the 2005 Super-heavyweight Russian senior national championships losing 29:14 to Vladislav Vasilev and won a bronze again in 2006 losing to Magomed Abdusalamov in the semi final by 49:44. The following year in 2007 he won the title beating European champion Islam Timurziev 22:19 in the final and followed the success up in 2008 beating Shamil Gadzhiev to win the title.

In November 2007, Sergeev won the "Good Luck Beijing" International Boxing Tournament at the Beijing Workers' Indoor Arena, China, beating Michael Hunter of the USA 21-18 in the final.

European Amateur Championships 2008
Sergeev represented Russia at the 2008 European Amateur Boxing Championships in Liverpool, England. He won a silver medal after being defeated in the final 9:2 by Bulgarian Kubrat Pulev.
2008 (as a Super heavyweight)
Preliminary round Defeated Andrew Wyn Jones (Wales) RSC4
Quarter Finals Defeated Mikhaili Sheibak (Belarus) 7-2
Semi Finals Defeated Memnun Hadzic (Bosnia) RTD3
Finals Lost to Kubrat Pulev (Bulgaria) 9-2

2009
At the 2009 World Amateur Boxing Championships he lost to Viktar Zuyev and didn't medal.

References

1982 births
Living people
Super-heavyweight boxers
Russian male boxers
Sportspeople from Vladimir Oblast